This is a list of properties and districts in Pickens County, Georgia that are listed on the National Register of Historic Places (NRHP).

Current listings

|}

References

Pickens
Buildings and structures in Pickens County, Georgia